Alexander Hellewell (1880–1934) was an English footballer who played in the Football League for Barnsley.

References

1880 births
1934 deaths
English footballers
Association football forwards
English Football League players
Mexborough F.C. players
Barnsley F.C. players